David C. Carpenter (born October 28, 1941) is a Canadian writer who lives in Saskatoon, Saskatchewan.  His oeuvre, which includes poetry, essays, short stories, novellas, and full-length books in fiction as well as non-fiction genres, focuses primarily on nature and his native western Canada. In 2010, his latest novel, A Hunter's Confession, was released, in which he explores the history of hunting, subsistence hunting versus hunting for sport, trophy hunting, and the meaning of the hunt for those who have written about it most eloquently.

Carpenter holds the Bachelor of Arts degree in modern languages (1962) and the Bachelor of Education degree (1964) from the University of Alberta, the Master of Arts degree in English (1967) from the University of Oregon and the Doctor of Philosophy from the University of Alberta (1973). He is married to artist Honor Keever; they reside in Saskatoon, where he has served on the faculty of the English Department at the University of Saskatchewan since 1975.

Works
The Forest, a novella by Georges Bugnet, translated from the original La Foret – 1977
Jokes for the Apocalypse – 1985
Jewels – 1986
God's Bedfellows – 1988
Writing Home – 1994
Courting Saskatchewan – 1996
Banjo Lessons – 1997
Fishing in Western Canada – 2000
Trout Stream Creed – 2003
The Ketzer – 2004
Luck – 2005
Niceman Cometh – 2008
Welcome to Canada – 2009
A Hunter's Confession – 2010
The Education of Augie Merasty - 2015 (by Joseph Auguste Merasty, with David Carpenter)

References

1941 births
Living people
Canadian male novelists
Writers from Edmonton
Writers from Saskatoon
20th-century Canadian male writers
21st-century Canadian male writers
20th-century Canadian novelists
21st-century Canadian novelists